The Mėkla is a river of Kaunas County, central Lithuania. It flows for 27 kilometres and has a basin area of 93  km². It is a left tributary of the Barupė.

The Mėkla river starts nearby Preišiogala, in Jonava District Municipality. It flows towards north western direction through Kaunas District Municipality and Kėdainiai District Municipality, then empties into the Labūnava Reservoir on the Barupė river next to Pamėkliai village.

Preišiogala, Puikoniai, Gelnai, Saviečiai, Pamėkliai villages are located on the shores of the Mėkla.

The hydronym probably derives from Lithuanian words mėkla ('dummy') and pamėklė, pamėkla ('phantom, ghost, spook').

References

Rivers of Lithuania
Kėdainiai District Municipality
Jonava District Municipality
Kaunas District Municipality